Tarło is a Polish surname, and may refer to the following nobles:

 Adam Tarło 91713–1744), Polish nobleman
 Aleksander Piotr Tarło
 Andrzej Tarło (died c. 1531), Polish nobleman
 Anna Tarło
 Barbara Tarło
 Jadwiga Tarło (XVI-?)
 Jan Tarło (d. 1572), Polish nobleman
 Jan Tarło (1527–1587)
 Jan Tarło (XV-1550)
 Jan Tarło (1684–1750)
 Jan Karol Tarło (1593-1645), Polish nobleman
 Karol Tarło (1639-1702), polish governor
 Paweł Tarło (died 1565), Polish nobleman
 Stanisław Tarło (died c. 1599), Polish nobleman
 Zygmunt Tarło (1561-1628), Polish-Lithuanian nobleman

See also
 Tarło family

Polish-language surnames